This is a list of women artists who were born in Wales or whose artworks, or careers, are closely associated with Wales.

A
Sadie Allen (1930–2017), painter, textile artist
Edith Lovell Andrews (1886–1980), painter
Manon Awst (born 1983), sculptor, performance artist

B
Irene Bache (1901–1999) London-born artist who lived in Swansea from 1942
Joan Baker (1922–2017), painter

C
Brenda Chamberlain (1912–1971), Welsh artist, poet and novelist, working in Wales and Greece
Felicity Charlton (1913–2009), Bristol-born artist who lived in Wales from 1939
Melanie Counsell (born 1964), installation artist and sculptor.
Glenys Cour (born 1924), painter and stained glass artist

D
Thereza Dillwyn Llewelyn (1834–1926), photographer
Edith Downing (1857–1931), sculptor

E
 Mildred Eldridge (1909–1991), artist born in London who lived in Wales from 1939

F
Laura Ford (born 1961), sculptor born in Cardiff

G
Valerie Ganz (1936–2015), painter
Esther Grainger (1912–1990), painter
Lillian Griffith (1877–1972), sculptor
Gwenny Griffiths (1867–1953), portrait painter

H
Nina Hamnett (1890–1956), Tenby-born artist and artists' model, who exhibited at the Royal Academy
Cicely Hey (1896–1980), English artist who lived in Llysfaen
Nichola and Sarah Hope, artists known for their visual artwork
Ray Howard-Jones (1903–1996), Berkshire-born artist who lived in Penarth from an early age 
Joan Hutt (1913–1985), Hertfordshire-born painter who moved to live in North Wales in 1949
Bethan Huws (born 1961)

J
Eveline Annie Jenkins (1893–1976), botanical artist and illustrator 
Kathryn Jenkins (1961–2009), was a scholar and writer of Welsh hymns 
Gwen John (1876–1939), painter
Christine Jones (born 1955), ceramicist 
Joy Farrall Jones (born 1933), painter and illustrator

K
Christine Kinsey (born 1942), painter

L
Kate Lambert (born 1983), fashion designer
Ruby Levick (c.1872–1940), sculptor
Thyrza Anne Leyshon (1892–1996), miniature painter 
Doris Lindner (1896–1979), sculptor
Eirian Llwyd (1951–2014), printmaker
Mary Lloyd (1819–1896), sculptor
Mary Lloyd Jones (born 1934), painter
Sarah J. Lloyd (born 1896), landscape painter
Alison Lochhead (1953) sculptor, painter and printmaker

M
Helen Mackay (1897–1973), sculptor
Edwina McGrail (born 1950), artist and poet
Valerie Miles (1914–1999), painter and illustrator
Eleri Mills (born 1955), painter
Tracey Moberly (born 1964), multidisciplinary artist
Mali Morris (born 1945)

N
Liz Neal (born 1973), artist based in London
Mary Edith Nepean (1876–1960)

O
Rachel Owen (1968–2016)
Joan Oxland (1920–2009), painter

P 
 Kusha Petts (1921–2003)
 Cherry Pickles (born 1950)

Q 

 Mary Quant (born 1934)

R
Shani Rhys James (born 1953), Australia-born painter, moved to Wales after graduation
Julie Roberts (born 1963), painter

S
Helen Sear (born 1955), photographic artist
Jane Simpson (born 1965), sculptor
Annie Morgan Suganami (born 1952)
Alia Syed (born 1964), Swansea-born artist and filmmaker, now living and working in London

W
Mary White (1926–2013), ceramic artist
Lucy Gwendolen Williams (1870–1955)
Claudia Williams (born 1933), painter
Margaret Lindsay Williams (1888–1960), portrait painter
Annie Williams (born 1942), still life watercolour painter who grew up in Wales
Sue Williams (born 1956), visual artist
Caroline Catherine Wilkinson (1822–1881)
Frances Elizabeth Wynne (1835–1907)
Nancy Wynne-Jones (1922–2006), painter

 
Welsh artists
Welsh
Welsh
Artists
Artists, women